Radio Zeta Rock & Pop (mostly known as "Z Rock & Pop" or simply as "Radio Z") is a most popular Peruvian rock and pop radio station in Peru. Z Rock & Pop characterises in broadcasting music from the 60's until 2020's and now at Rock & Pop format for 24 hours per day via internet. Actually it's the ownership of Monsefú's broadcaster Higinio Capuñay's Corporación Universal (Universal Corporation), since the broadcasting station was bought to the extinct Corporación Aeropuerto S.A. (Airport Corporation Inc.) where it belonged to with the departed radio stations like Radio A and R-700, both administrated by deceased politician and broadcaster Dr. Dagoberto Láinez.

History

Antecedents
A broadcasting station of varied music called Sabor Mix occupied on 95.5 MHz, which belonged to the same Corporación Aeropuerto S.A. where it was along with Radio A and R-700, in which it had to be shut down because that station didn't sell. Therefore, the general manager Hugo Salazar Díaz, Mrs. Martha Díaz Láinez Widow's son, in a risky businessman outburst decided to change the format to the station to bet for something newfangled and quality.

Meanwhile, the announcer Juan Carlos Hurtado, who laboured at the Hispanic Music station (Radio A), welcomed the manager who demonstrated his concern about what he wanted a radial product that has quality, popularity and above all that gets to the A1 customers as he called them.

There were many things to do like making an announcers staff and select the themes that will give life to this new project and that they would be the principal protagonists of the radio station...thus Ninoska Cuba (Juan Carlos Hurtado's spouse) joined the project. The new broadcasting station was set to go quietly on-air by 1 December, 15 December or when 1998 starts, but they selected so the radiostation goes on-air by 8 December 1997 for cabalistic question: for John Lennon, Jim Morrison (The Doors) and for being the Announcer's Day.

Long meetings were held among Juan Carlos, Ninoska and Hugo to find the name of the new station. They had the surname "Rock & Pop", the name was missing though. The new radiostation could be called "Radioactiva" ("Radioactive"), "Planeta" ("Planet"), "Andrómeda" ("Andromed"), "Blue", "Onyx", "Oxígeno" ("Oxygen") or "La Clásica" ("The Classic") but none of these names convinced them; till one day the deceased politician and radial administrator Dr. Dagoberto Láinez told Juan Carlos Hurtado that if he had a radiostation which played Spanish Music on (Radio A) and the new one would play on the opposite, so he put  "Z" which was the opposite to "A"; and it was that "Z Rock & Pop" was born.

First years
Z Rock & Pop 95.5 FM officially went on-air on 8 December 1997 at 00:00 with the 1970s classic "Venus" by Dutch band Shocking Blue as the first song. In its first years the station bet for the latest in music mixing with the classics of Rock & Pop such in English as in Spanish with genres like rock, pop, R&B, oldies, adult contemporary, AOR, new wave, ballads and reggae. The first DJ's staff was formed with Juan Carlos Hurtado, Ninoska Cuba, Coco Valderrama, Arturo Otoya, Juan Vargas and Luigi Santana.

The radiostation became competitor of Stereo 100, which played on the classic format; and of Studio 92 and Radio América 94.3 FM for the latest and the best in music. Then by May 2004, the radiostation also had a direct competence which was Oxígeno 102.1 FM, a brand-new station of then which played the same format on.

From 1998, the radiostation decided to innovate with the entry of more DJ's who will form the group, such in sound support, production and contents. In addition, by broadcasting the weekly countdowns where the one-hit wonders were played on, so "The Hot Z" is named for the song which was the number one of the mentioned ranking. Also, the annual countdowns were held and broadcast every 8 December, date of the anniversary of the radiostation, where they selected the "Hot Z" of the year. The ranking lasted until 2005 so the radiostation started broadcasting more classic music, specially from the 80's.

In 2002, the website of the radiostation www.radioz.fm is premiered, where the audience could get some information about the latest music and artists, play games online, laugh with some humorous sketches and specially, vote for songs for any ranking that were set to be played on the radio.

Change to 1980s music
After the broadcasting of the special ranking "Los Últimos 20" ("The Last 20") held on 13–15 May 2005, Z Rock & Pop shut down the weekly countdowns which played current music to broadcast music from the 1960s, 1970s, 1980s, 1990s and alternating with some themes of the moment. Therefore, Z Rock & Pop changes its slogan to "Lo mejor de los 80… y más" ("The best of the 80… and more") as a base to broadcasting of 1980s songs. The change caused indignation to many listeners who wanted to hear more actual themes the radiostation used to play on. The last broadcasting of the annual ranking "The Hot Z" was held when the radiostation turned 8 years on-air where Keane's "Everybody's Changing" was the song of that year.

In July 2006, the website of the station changed its structure. The sections like "Chica Zeta" ("Girl Z"), "Hogar" ("Home"), "Tecnología" ("Technology"), among others that were since the website was created so they could be replaced for the new sections like "Wallpapers Z", "Musicómetro" ("Musicometre"), etc. At the end of August of that year, the DJ's Juan Carlos Hurtado, Ninoska and Coco Valderrama left Z Rock & Pop to appear on other broadcasting stations.

The last years
Although it only focused on 1980s music, Z Rock & Pop also played some songs of the moment between 2005 and 2009 such as the following:

2005

 The Rolling Stones - Streets of Love Keane - This Is the Last Time Keane - Bend and Break Robbie Williams - Tripping Bon Jovi - Have a Nice Day James Blunt - You're Beautiful Santana feat.  Michelle Branch &  The Wreckers - I'm Feeling You Green Day - Wake Me Up When September Ends

2006

 Daniel Powter - Bad Day Dixie Chicks - Not Ready to Make Nice Yusuf - Heaven/Where True Love Goes Roxette - One Wish Bob Sinclar feat.  Steve Edwards - World, Hold On (Children of the Sky) Scissor Sisters feat.  Elton John - I Don't Feel Like Dancin'

2007

 Maroon 5 - Makes Me Wonder Bon Jovi - Lost Highway Bruce Springsteen - Radio Nowhere Muse - Starlight Mika - Relax, Take It Easy

2008

 Miguel Ríos - Memorias de la Carretera Coldplay - Viva la Vida Rata Blanca - Mujer Amante (Live) The Killers - Read My Mind The Killers - Human

2009

 Julio Andrade - Bajo el Sol de California Nosequien y Los Nosecuantos - La Tierra del Sol Libido - Nadie Sabe Lo Que Vendrá Libido - Malvada Michael Jackson - This Is It Lady Gaga - Poker Face Pedro Suárez-Vértiz feat.  Juan Diego Flórez - Nadia Pedro Suárez-Vértiz - Amazonas Gustavo Cerati - Déjà Vu Muse - Uprising

In November 2007, some DJ's of the recently disappeared Radio A became part of Z Rock & Pop such as Karla Fernández, Marco Antonio Vásquez and the return of the DJ's Hibar Saldaña (who went back to the radiostation after 7 months) and Michael Phun, who was back on Z Rock & Pop after 5 years. Hence, during the period November 2007-August 2008, Z Rock & Pop had a DJ's staff in which all were part of its sister station Radio A except Leo Pro, this is because the current DJ Felipe Alfredo had been part of that broadcasting station during 1997–2003. By that month, the DJ's Rocky Rodríguez, Elizabeth Rodríguez and Tito Bernaza left Z Rock & Pop to become part of a brand-new sister station Radiomix (radiostation that substituted Radio A).

In the middle of 2008 the weekly countdowns were back but for this time as "La Esencia de la Semana" ("The Essence of the Week") where it broadcast the most ordered songs from the 60's, 70's, 80's, 90's, as well as some new songs. This weekly countdown lasted until the end of February 2009.

In February 2009, the radiostation was sold to a Monsefú radio entrepreneur Higinio Capuñay Sarpán. As a result of that, on 1 March some Z Rock & Pop's subsidiary stations were replaced by a Cumbia radiostation "La Karibeña", causing depression to the "fanatics" who loved the good music because Z was the only station which difussionated Rock & Pop music. The website of Z Rock & Pop was changed from www.radioz.fm to  so it matches with the other links of the other stations in the same company.

However, in July 2009 Z Rock & Pop started to play Spanish Ballads on, a fact that occasioned that the audience are indignators by wondering why a Rock & Pop station could play that genre in which isn't its format. As a result of complaints about the wrong genre the station played on, Z Rock & Pop was back to its original format at the beginning of August 2009. In that month, DJ Coco Valderrama was back to Z Rock & Pop's microphones till December 2009.

Nonetheless, whilst Z Rock & Pop sponsored a concert that was set by 19 January 2010 which was of Thrash Metal band Metallica, an upcoming Capuñay's brand-new radiostation was announced to go on-air by the end of December 2009 on 95.5 MHz. This occasionates that many listeners wonder what could happen with the concert if the sponsored station disappeared. But in the middle of December 2009, every DJ was gradually taking leave of their listeners because the broadcasting station was going to change its format. In consequence, in the night of 30 December 2009, the radiostation presenter Mariley Paredes presented the last song for the station which was "Por Qué No Se Van" ("Why Don't They Go") by Los Prisioneros ("The Prisoners"). Afterwards, exactly at 20:00, the brand-new station of Reggaeton-Salsa-Cumbia format called "La Kalle" went on-air. The off-the-air of Z Rock & Pop caused much anger and depression to many listeners or "fanatics" who loved good music and who wanted to enjoy the Rock & Pop music of all time.

The return
Due to many complaints by the radiostation audience, on 26 January 2010 Z Rock & Pop was released as "Zeta Online" via . In the other hand, Z Rock & Pop was back on-air in some cities of Peru like Arequipa, Chiclayo, Cusco, Ilo, etc.

By the period 2010–2012, Z Rock & Pop was gradually expanding its signal throughout the country. Such signal was listened in Chachapoyas, Huancayo, La Oroya, Tarapoto, Pucallpa, Iquitos, Ica, Tacna, Camaná, inter alia. On 23 May 2012 the signal of Z Rock & Pop returned to Lima through 96.1 MHz at the audience's request who needed to listen to good music.

However, the relaunch didn't thrive because on the frequency 96.1 MHz in Lima was in dispute: Z Rock & Pop could be attained to be heard but another youth format station that was owned by a concert organiser company interfered Z Rock & Pop's signal, making both to sound at the same time on the same frequency. Because of that, Radio Miraflores S.A. entered into a judgement against Corporación Universal and Kandavu Producciones (Kandavu Productions) to get the frequency. In consequence, 6 September would be the last day that Z Rock & Pop broadcasting its signal in Lima, causing much depression to the audience again.

In 2013, the coverage was gradually reducing due to low ratings the station had. The majority of its frequencies were taken over by its sister stations like Exitosa (Successful), La Hot (radiostation which lasted till the beginning of 2014) and La Kalle (station that replaces La Hot at the beginning of 2014). In the other hand, the annual ranking "La Hot Z del Año" ("The Hot Z of the Year") was back after 8 years one day before Z Rock & Pop turned 16 years on-air. In the mentioned countdown, the song "Memoria" ("Memory") by French band Indochine was crowned as the song of that year.

Present time
Z Rock & Pop offers all the best Rock & Pop from the 60's, 70's, 80's, 90's as well as the current ones at all its styles. It broadcasts in some cities in Peru through its assigned frequencies, as on internet via  for the rest of the country and in all over the world.

On 12 August 2015, Z Rock & Pop's signal returned to Lima via 98.7 MHz. That is because numerous listeners made the reiterated request of the return to the dial. The Signal could be heard clearly in the East zone of the city. In addition, Z Rock & Pop's signal returned to its frequency in Piura (89.5 MHz), as well as in Mollendo via 93.9 MHz. In a few days towards the end of August 2015, the signal returned to Iquitos via 107.1 MHz.

By this new stage of the radio station, it commenced to play Eurodance in its programming along with Rock, Pop, Oldies and rest of genres, including soft music in "Z Sunset" (Monday to Friday 18:00-19:00) and "La Balada de Tu Vida" ("The Ballad of Your Life") (Sundays 18:00-20:00). On October 2, 2015, Mariley Paredes returned to the microphones of Z Rock & Pop booth again to lead the radio program "Entre Zeteros" ("Amongst "Z" Lovers") by replacing the announcer Karim Juliet who was sacked off the broadcasting station.

In November 2015, the radio station stopped broadcasting in Cusco where it appeared on 88.3 MHz to be replaced by its sister station La Kalle. On the other hand, the radio station is announcing a ranking for its 18 years of broadcasting by the day of its anniversary (8 December). Furthermore, from Saturday 21 November 2015, the announcer Juan Carlos Hurtado is back to Z Rock & Pop replacing César André in the mornings. But it lasted almost one week until César André reappeared on "Café con Z" ("Coffee with Z"), causing the audience wonder what happened with Juan Carlos Hurtado.

In the middle of December 2015 its signal in Piura was shut down so Radio Inspiración (Radio Inspiration) returned to its frequency (89.5 MHz). However, there are some rumors that its owner (Higinio Capuñay) had bought the frequency of 105.5 so that Z Rock & Pop could broadcast on that frequency due to complaints of its listeners who lived in Lima: that the sound was heard too weak, that there were interferences with another radio station, etc.

At the end of January 2016, Gino Lozano and Julio Zeta announced their departure of the radio station, leaving Mariley Paredes as an only announcer of Z Rock & Pop. The program "Z Sunset" is now broadcasting from Monday to Thursday at the same schedule (18;00-19;00) from March 2016. In mid-April 2016, the frequency in Lima (98.7 MHz) stopped broadcasting its signal. Recently on 5 May 2016, all its frequencies were substituted by a Latin-American music station; so the radio station shut down its signal in the cities where it used to broadcast on (Arequipa, Chiclayo, Ica, Mollendo and Tacna) to continue broadcasting via internet. From that point, no presenters are heard on the radiostation any longer.

At the beginning of August 2016, DJ Felipe Alfredo announced his departure of Z Rock & Pop to commence his new stage of his life.

In the middle of August 2016, the radiostation was back to normal: the ballads are played on again 24 hours a day along with Rock, Pop, Oldies, and rest of genres, including a little bit of Eurodance. However, most of the radiostation's old id's are played on 24 hours a day such as Es Música (Is Music), Mas y mejor música de los 80 (More and better 80's music), a bit of La esencia de los 80 (The essence of the 80's) along with some of the latest ids of the radiostation such as Marca Original (Original Brand). Also, there are some rumours that the radiostation could broadcast back on the FM. On the last days of 2016, Randy Calandra, the ex-DJ of the radiostation who is now the Exitosa,s voiceover, announced that on 31 December from 20:00 La Caja de Año Nuevo (The New Year's Box) will be broadcast with the best mixes by DJ Z. Besides, there are rumours that Randy Calandra would be the official voiceover of the radiostation, this is due to an advertisement which features his voice with some songs from the 80's, 90's and today's.

From May 2017, Hispa Rock & Pop and Domingo 80 y Z (Sundays 80 & Z, then changed to Domingo Clasico) are back to the station.

Programs and sequences

The programs, sequences and identifications of the radio station have an origin, the production department directed by the suitable person (Ninoska Cuba)...the maximum creativity, the imagination never before was so well focused and directed to the right place they offered in their proposal, hence the names appeared:

Current programs and sequences

Hispa Rock & PopHalf an hour of Rock & Pop in SpanishMonday to Friday 12:00-12:30
La Hora del Break (Break Time)Monday to Friday 13:00-14:00
Z SunsetMonday to Saturday 18:00-19:00
La Caja (The Box) (with DJ Z, previously with DJ Tavo)The best remixes of three decades of music directed by DJ Z.Friday and Saturday 19:00-06:00
Domingo Clásico (Classic Sunday)Sunday all-day
Disco Z (program)Sunday 08:00-10:00 (remixes by DJ Z) and 18:00-20:00
Duplex Two songs by an artist or group that were played on in any moment.
Disco 70 y Z (Disco 70 & Z) Sequence where Disco music is played on in any moment, specially on Classic Sundays.
Un Instante en Liverpool (One Instant in Liverpool)Sequence of The Beatles played on in any moment.

Past programs and sequences

Billboard Año por Año (Billboard Year by Year) (with Juan Carlos Hurtado)
Billboard Rock & Pop(with Juan Carlos Hurtado)
Billboard 80's (with Juan Carlos Hurtado)
Jet Z (with Juan Carlos Hurtado)Mon-Fri 10:00-12:30
Pasajeros en Primera Clase (Passengers in First Class)Half an hour of the specials of an artist or group.Mon-Fri 12:30-13:00
Etiqueta Negra (Black Label) (with Coco Valderrama)
Ranking: Las 10 "Z" de la Semana (Ranking: The 10 "Z" of the Week)Saturday 10:00-11:00
Z Express (Sequence)
Sábados de Pura Música (Saturdays of Full Music)
Expo Z
Ionósfera (Ionosphere)
Z Zoom
La Fiesta de las 100 Horas (The Party of 100 Hours)Independence Day and New Year's Day program.
Pijamas Party
Hey Judy (with Judy Mejía)
Z Noticias (Z News) (with Randy Calandra)
Jack el Despertador (Jack the Alarm Clock) (with Randy Calandra)
Rockosaurios (Rockosaurs) (with Randy Calandra)
Tiranosaurio (Tiranosaurus)
El Cuarto Oscuro (The Dark Room)
El Agujero Negro (The Black Hole)The New Wave break of the radiostation.
Clases de Español (Spanish Classes) (with Juan Vargas)
Factor Z
Azulado (Bluish)
Generación Z (Generation Z)
Top News del Fin de Semana (Top News of the Weekend)
Z Pedidos (Z Orders)
Morning Show (with Ninoska Cuba)
Conexión Z (Conexion Z) (with Angee Gonzáles)A program that broadcast 90's music.
90 60 90 (with Mariley Paredes)
Jazz en Z (Jazz on Z) (with Daniel Chapell)Sunday 21:00-22:00
La 10 Calientes del Día (The Hot 10 of the Day) (with Coco Valderrama)
Las Top News del Día (The Top News of the Day)
Z Rock & Rock (with Carlos Chávez, then Mariley Paredes)One hour of Hard Rock and Heavy Metal.Monday to Thursday 22:00-23:00
La Balada de Tu Vida (The Ballad of Your Life)Sunday 18:00-19:00
El Charly en Z (The Charly on Z) (with Carlos Chávez)Monday to Thursday 23:00-00:00
Open Mind (with Carlos Chávez and Mario Arroyo in some editions)An early riser show of the radiostation.Monday to Thursday 23:00-06:00
El Show de Mariley (Mariley's Night Show) (with Mariley Paredes)
Hugo de Éstos Días (Hugo of These Days) (with Hugo Salazar)
El Más Clásico (The Most Classic)
Viernes 80 y Z (Friday 80 & Z)
Clásicos Etiqueta Negra (Black Label Classics) (with Coco Valderrama)
Hispa Rock
Generación 80 (Generation 80) (with Felipe Alfredo)
El Coleccionista... (The Collector…) (with Hugo Salazar)
LiverpoolOne hour with The Beatles' hits.Sunday 22:00-23:00
Noctámbulos (Night Owls) (with Sonia Freundt)
Sábados con Felipe (Saturdays with Felipe) (with Felipe Alfredo)
Sábados con Ninoska (Saturdays with Ninoska) (with Ninoska Cuba)
Sábados con Mariley (Saturdays with Mariley) (with Mariley Paredes)
El Ranking del Siglo (The Ranking of the Century)
Música Z Rock & Pop (Music Z Rock & Pop)
I Feel Good (with Gerardo Manuel)Monday to Friday 20:00-21:00
Prime Time (with Coco Valderrama)
Soft Z (with Felipe Alfredo, then Coco Valderrama)
Especialmente Z (Specially Z)
Lima Airplay (with Ninoska Cuba)The memories of Lima city in the 80's and 90'sSaturday 10:00-11:00
Café con Z (Coffee with Z) (with Ninoska Cuba)Monday to Friday 07:00-09:00
Top Ten del Oyente (Top 10 of the Listener)The 10 songs most requested by the public, specially based on the 80's.
Super Mario (with Mario Arroyo)
Bailando con... (Dancing with… )
Rock Clásico en Z (Classic Rock on Z)
Una y Una (One and One)
Zona Z (Z Zone)
Z Express (Program)
El Domingo 80 y Z (Sunday 80 & Z)Sunday all-day
5a las 5 (5 at 5)
La Central (The Central)
La Esencia de la Semana (The Essence of the Week)The top 20 of 70's, 80's, 90's and 00's songs most requested of the week.
Cosecha 80 y Z (Reap 80 & Z)Sequence of 80's music.
El Musiquarium (The Musiquarium) (with Randy Calandra)Monday to Friday 06:00-10:00
En Blue Jeans (In Blue Jeans) (with Coco Valderrama)Monday to Friday 10:00-14:00 and Saturday 14:00-17:00
Control Z (with Felipe Alfredo)Monday-Friday 14:00-17:00 and Saturday 10:00-14:00
Pecado Original (Original Sin) (with Mariley Paredes)Monday to Saturday 17:00-20:00
Nochentera (Whole Night + 80's) (with César André)Monday to Friday 21:00-00:00
Z Vip and VipSunday all-day
ClassicSequence where all the classic songs from 1960 to 1979 are played on.
Disco ZSequence of Disco music
Made in PeruSequence where Peruvian artists and groups are played on.
Z Non-Stop (with DJ Z)The best mix of Rock & Pop music made and produced by DJ ZFriday and Saturday 21:00
Z ExtremeSequence of Hard Rock and Heavy Metal music.
Xpress MusicProgram where people requested a song.
Z AdvanceSequence of the latest in music.
Descarga 80 y Z (Download 80 & Z) (Sequence of Radiopolis)Monday to Friday 15:00-15:30
La Previa de los Sábados (The antechamber of Saturdays) (with César André)
Billboard: Un Día como Hoy (Billboard: One Day Like Today)
Zábado con Z ("Zaturday" with "Z")Saturday all-day
El Tocadiscos (The Turntable) (with Gino Lozano)Monday to Friday 19:00-23:00
Radiopolis (with Julio Zeta)Monday to Saturday 14:00-18:00
Entre Zeteros (Amongst "Z" lovers) (with Mariley Paredes)Monday to Friday 09:00-13:00
Rezeteando (Re-Z-ing)Sunday to Friday 23:00-06:00
La Hora del Sunset (Sunset Time)Monday to Saturday 18:00-19:00 (program that substituted Z Sunset in the first weeks of August 2016)

Presenters

Z Rock & Pop has been characterised for being a broadcasting station with fresh voices. Always with professionalism. Right now, the relation of presenters, announcers or DJ's who have passed through the radiostation's booths:

1997-1999

Juan Carlos Hurtado (1997-2006, 2015)
Ninoska Cuba (1997-2006)
Coco Valderrama (1997-2006, 2009, 2010–2012)
Luigi Santana (1997-1999)
Juan Vargas (1997-2003)
Arturo Otoya (d. 2014) (1997-1998, 1999–2000)
Daniel Chapell (1998-2006)
Judy Mejía (1998-2000)
Mauricio Martínez (1999)
José Ángeles (1998-2000)
Randy Calandra (1999, 2009)
Michael Phun (1999-2001, 2007–2009)
Víctor McDonald (1999-2002)
Mario Arroyo (1999-2002, 2004, 2005–2007, 2009)
Mariley Paredes (1999-2007, 2009, 2010–2013, 2015–2016)

2000-2009

Jesús Cueva (2000-2001)
Saulo Gonzáles (2002-2003)
José Araujo (2002)
Angee Gonzáles (2002-2004)
Carlos Chávez (2003, 2003–2005)
Kique Castro (2003-2004, 2005)
Hugo Salazar (2003-2004)
Gustavo Bisbal (DJ Tavo) (2004-2006)
Felipe Alfredo Maguiña (2004-2009, 2010–2016)
Alfredo Cañote (2004-2006)
Sonia Freundt (2004)
Gerardo Manuel (2005-2006)
Elizabeth Rodríguez (2006-2007)
Rocky Rodríguez (2006-2007)
Hibar Saldaña (2006-2007, 2007–2009)
Leo Pro (2007-2009)
Tito Bernaza (2007)
Denisse Mac Cubbin (2007)
Karla Fernández (2007-2009)
Marco Antonio Vásquez (2007-2008)
José Arias (2008-2009)
César André (2009, 2010–2015, 2015–2016)
Carlos Vásquez (DJ Z) (2009-2016, 2016-current)

2010-current

Gino Lozano (2010-2011, 2015–2016)
Kike Fernández (2014-2015)
Karim Juliet Alegría (2015)
Virguit Delawicht (2015)
Julio Santos (Julio Zeta) (2015-2016)

Frequencies

Past frequencies

1997-2009

2010-2011

2011-2012

2012-2013

2014-2016

Slogans

Ranking
Z Rock & Pop has broadcast different annual rankings during 1998-2005 as well as in the 2013–2014. These are the annual rankings the radiostation provided every 8 December:
 
1998
10°  Aerosmith - I Don't Want to Miss a Thing9°  Fito Páez - El Amor Después del Amor8°  Jimmy Ray - Are You Jimmy Ray?7°  Lighthouse Family - High6°  Supertramp - Sooner or Later5°  Céline Dion - My Heart Will Go On4°  Savage Garden - Truly Madly Deeply3°  Shania Twain - You're Still the One2°  Fool's Garden - Lemon TreeHot Z:  Natalie Imbruglia - Torn/ Fastball - The Way
1999
20°19°18°17°16°15°  Shania Twain - Man! I Feel Like a Woman!14°13°12°11°10°  Santana feat.  Maná - Corazón Espinado9°  Shania Twain - That Don't Impress Me Much8°  Backstreet Boys - I Want It That Way7°  Savage Garden - I Knew I Loved You6°  Lou Bega - Mambo No. 55°  Blondie - Maria4°  Shawn Mullins - Lullaby3°  Santana feat.  Rob Thomas - Smooth2°  New Radicals - You Get What You GiveHot Z:  Cher - Believe
2000
40°  Tom Jones feat.  The Cardigans - Burning Down the House39°  a-ha - Summer Moved On38°  Mikel Erentxun - California37°  The Corrs - Breathless36°  Chumbawamba - She's Got All the Friends That Money Can Buy35°  Caifanes - Afuera34°  Santana - Primavera33°  Richard Ashcroft - A Song for the Lovers/ Eiffel 65 - Move Your Body32°  Tam Tam Go! - Atrapados en la Red31°  Westlife - Fool Again30°  Britney Spears - (You Drive Me) Crazy29°  Alanis Morissette - That I Would Be Good28°  Savage Garden - Crash and Burn/ Eiffel 65 - Blue (Da Ba Dee)27°  Shakira - Dónde Están los Ladrones?/ Anastacia - I'm Outta Love26°  Shania Twain - Don't Be Stupid (You Know I Love You)25°  The Wallflowers - Sleepwalker24°  Backstreet Boys - Show Me the Meaning of Being Lonely23°  Travis - Why Does It Always Rain on Me?22°  Bic Runga - Sway21°  Ana Torroja - Ya No Te Quiero20°  Red Hot Chili Peppers - Otherside19°  Five - Keep on Movin'18°  Tom Jones feat.  Mousse T. - Sex Bomb17°  Vertical Horizon - Everything You Want/ Lara Fabian - I Will Love Again16°  Lonestar - Amazed15°  La Mosca Tsé - Tsé - Para No Verte Más/ Eiffel 65 - Too Much of Heaven14°  Filter - Take a Picture13°  Pedro Suárez-Vértiz - Rapta la Mona12°  Madonna - American Pie11°  La Ley - Fuera de Mí10°  Sting feat.  Cheb Mami - Desert Rose9°  Pedro Suárez-Vértiz - Alguien Que Bese Como Tú8°  Mark Knopfler - What It Is7°  Libido - En Esta Habitación6°  Macy Gray - I Try5°  Viejas Locas - Me Gustas Mucho4°  U2 - Beautiful Day3°  Red Hot Chili Peppers - Californication2°  Madonna - MusicHot Z:  La Ley - Aquí
2001
40°  Roxette - Real Sugar39°  Sugar Ray - When It's Over38°  The Corrs feat.  Alejandro Sanz - Una Noche37°  Westlife - My Love36°  Madonna - Amazing35°  Robbie Williams - Better Man34°  Juanes - Fíjate Bien33°  Laura Pausini - Quiero Decirte que te Amo32°  Backstreet Boys - More Than That31°  R.E.M. - Imitation of Life30°  Train - Drops of Jupiter29°  Ana Torroja feat. Miguel Bosé - Duende28°  Aerosmith - Jaded27°  U2 - Walk On26°  Travis - Side25°  Dido - Hunter24°  La Ley - Eternidad23°  Robbie Williams - Supreme22°  Janet Jackson - Someone to Call My Lover21°  Aerosmith - Fly Away from Here20°  Nelly Furtado - Turn Off the Light19°  Modjo - Lady (Hear Me Tonight)18°  NSYNC - This I Promise You17°  U2 - Stuck in a Moment You Can't Get Out Of16°  Bon Jovi - Thank You for Loving Me15°  La Oreja de Van Gogh - La Playa14°  Dido - Don't Think of Me13°  Michael Jackson - You Rock My World12°  Robbie Williams - Rock DJ11°  Backstreet Boys - Shape of My Heart10°  Madonna - What It Feels Like for a Girl9°  Roxette - The Centre of the Heart8°  Dido - Here with Me7°  Madonna - Don't Tell Me6°  La Ley - Mentira5°  Travis - Sing4°  Lenny Kravitz - Again3°  Nelly Furtado - I'm Like a Bird2°  U2 - ElevationHot Z:  Dido - Thank You
2002
40°  Sheryl Crow - Soak Up the Sun39°  Miguel Ríos feat. Manolo García - Insurrección38°  The Corrs - Would You Be Happier?37°  Roxette - A Thing About You36°  Robbie Williams feat.  Nicole Kidman - Somethin' Stupid35°  Charly García - Tu Vicio34°  Eric Clapton - Believe in Life33°  Dido - Hunter32°  Shania Twain - I'm Gonna Getcha Good!31°  El Canto del Loco - Son Sueños30°  Alanis Morissette - Precious Illusions29°  La Ley - Intenta Amar28°  Five for Fighting - Superman (It's Not Easy)27°  Enrique Bunbury - Lady Blue26°  Elton John - I Want Love25°  Bryan Adams - Here I Am24°  La Ley feat.  Ely Guerra - El Duelo (Unplugged)23°  Miguel Ríos feat.  Álex Lora - Triste Canción22°  Wheatus - A Little Respect21°  Kylie Minogue - Love at First Sight20°  Hombres G - Lo Noto19°  Los Prisioneros - Por Qué No Se Van (Live)18°  P!nk - Get the Party Started17°  Maná - Eres Mi Religión16°  Nelly Furtado - ...on the Radio (Remember the Days)15°  Alanis Morissette - Hands Clean14°  Juanes feat.  Nelly Furtado - Fotografía/ Juanes - Es Por Ti13°  Coldplay - In My Place12°  The Rolling Stones - Don't Stop11°  Vanessa Carlton - A Thousand Miles10°  Sophie Ellis-Bextor - Murder on the Dancefloor9°  Travis - Side8°  Coldplay - Trouble7°  Maná - Ángel de Amor6°  Elefante - De La Noche a la Mañana5°  Avril Lavigne - Complicated4°  Juanes - A Dios le Pido3°  Natalie Imbruglia - Wrong Impression2°  Kylie Minogue - Can't Get You Out of My HeadHot Z:  Santana feat.  Michelle Branch - The Game of Love
2003
40°  Zucchero feat.  Maná - Baila Morena39°  Gondwana - Felicidad38°  Pedro Suárez-Vértiz - Bailar37°  Madonna - American Life/ Madonna - Die Another Day36°  Shania Twain - I'm Gonna Getcha Good!35°  The Cardigans - For What It's Worth34°  Juanes - Mala Gente33°  Stereophonics - Maybe Tomorrow32°  Ziggy Marley - True to Myself31°  Kevin Johansen - El Círculo30°  Audioslave - Like a Stone29°  Libido - Frágil28°  Sixpence None the Richer - Don't Dream It's Over27°  La Ley - Ámate y Sálvate26°  Jarabe de Palo - Bonito25°  INXS - Tight24°  t.A.T.u. - Not Gonna Get Us23°  Zen - Sol22°  Evanescence feat.  Paul McCoy - Bring Me to Life21°  Avril Lavigne - Knockin' on Heaven's Door20°  Nelly feat.  Kelly Rowland - Dilemma19°  The Black Eyed Peas - Where Is the Love?18°  Babasónicos - Los Calientes17°  Sophie Ellis-Bextor - Mixed Up World16°  La Ley - Más Allá15°  Santana feat.  Michelle Branch - The Game of Love14°  Gustavo Cerati - Karaoke13°  Coldplay - God Put a Smile upon Your Face12°  Michelle Branch - Are You Happy Now?11°  Robbie Williams - Feel10°  Coldplay - The Scientist9°  Avril Lavigne - I'm with You8°  Gustavo Cerati - Cosas Imposibles7°  Dishwalla - Angels or Devils6°  Dido - White Flag5°  t.A.T.u. - All the Things She Said4°  Michelle Branch - All You Wanted3°  Simply Red - Sunrise2°  The Rolling Stones - Don't StopHot Z:  Coldplay - Clocks
2004
40°  Lenny Kravitz - California39°  Verttigo - Virus de Amor38°  Eamon - F**k It (I Don't Want You Back)37°  George Michael - Amazing36°  Nosequien y Los Nosecuantos - Yo de Ti35°  Robbie Williams - Radio34°  Lenny Kravitz - Where Are We Runnin'?33°  Julieta Venegas - Lento/ Julieta Venegas - Andar Conmigo32°  Maná - Te Llevaré al Cielo31°  The Black Eyed Peas - Where Is the Love?30°  Babasónicos - Y Qué?29°  Coti feat.  Andrés Calamaro - Nada Fue un Error28°  The Vines - Winning Days27°  Avril Lavigne - My Happy Ending26°  Cementerio Club - Inmortales25°  Alanis Morissette - Everything24°  Kylie Minogue - Slow23°  Joss Stone - Fell in Love with a Boy22°  No Doubt - It's My Life21°  Keane - Everybody's Changing20°  Evanescence - My Immortal19°  TK - Ilusión18°  Duran Duran - (Reach Up for The) Sunrise17°  Nelly Furtado - Try/ Nelly Furtado - Powerless (Say What You Want)16°  Babasónicos - Irresponsables15°  Israel Kamakawiwoʻole - Somewhere over the Rainbow14°  Reamonn - Supergirl13°  Avril Lavigne - Don't Tell Me12°  3 Doors Down - Here Without You11°  Scissor Sisters - Take Your Mama10°  Limp Bizkit - Behind Blue Eyes9°  Babasónicos - Putita8°  The Rasmus - In the Shadows7°  OutKast - Hey Ya!6°  Maroon 5 - She Will Be Loved5°  U2 - Vertigo4°  Café Tacvba - Eres3°  Hoobastank - The Reason2°  Maroon 5 - This LoveHot Z:  Keane - Somewhere Only We Know
2005
15°  Robbie Williams - Tripping14°  Keane - Bend and Break13°  Bon Jovi - Have a Nice Day12°  The Rolling Stones - Streets of Love11°  Keane - This Is the Last Time10°  Santana feat.  Michelle Branch &  The Wreckers - I'm Feeling You9°  Audioslave - Be Yourself8°  Frágil - No Soy De Fierro7°  Scissor Sisters - Take Your Mama6°  Natalie Imbruglia - Shiver5°  Maroon 5 - Sunday Morning4°  Green Day - Boulevard of Broken Dreams3°  Coldplay - Speed of Sound2°  James Blunt - You're BeautifulHot Z:  Keane - Everybody's Changing
2013 (*)
10°  P!nk feat.  Nate Ruess - Just Give Me a Reason/ The Black Keys - Lonely Boy9°  Keane - Higher Than the Sun8°  The Rolling Stones - Doom and Gloom7°  Muse - Panic Station6°  Fun feat.  Janelle Monáe - We Are Young5°  Bruno Mars - Locked Out of Heaven4°  Nickelback - Lullaby3°  Bon Jovi - Because We Can2°  Foster the People - Houdini1°  Keane - DisconnectedHot Z:  Indochine - Memoria
2014
20°  Neon Trees - Everybody Talks/ Lykke Li - Get Some19°  OneRepublic - Counting Stars18°  Foster the People - Best Friend17°  Daft Punk feat.  Pharrell Williams - Lose Yourself to Dance16°  U2 - The Miracle (Of Joey Ramone)15°  Fall Out Boy - Young Volcanoes14°  Bruno Mars - Treasure13°  Capital Cities - One Minute More12°  The Killers - Just Another Girl11°  Kings of Leon - Supersoaker10°  American Authors - Best Day of My Life9°  The Black Keys - Fever8°  Placebo - Loud Like Love7°  Coldplay - Magic6°  Two Wounded Birds - If Only We Remain5°  Daft Punk feat.  Julian Casablancas - Instant Crush4°  U2 - Ordinary Love3°  Coldplay - A Sky Full of Stars2°  Capital Cities - Safe and Sound1°  Pharrell Williams - HappyHot Z:  Daft Punk feat.  Pharrell Williams &  Nile Rodgers - Get Lucky
2015 (**)
18°  Goo Goo Dolls - Iris (1998) /  Robbie Williams - Angels (1998)17°  Dishwalla - Angels Or Devils (2003)16°  Gorillaz - Clint Eastwood (2001)15°  Indochine - Memoria (2013)/ Travis - Sing (2001)14°  Bon Jovi - It's My Life (2000)13°  Natalie Imbruglia - Torn (1998)12°  Red Hot Chili Peppers - Otherside (2000)11°  The Wallflowers - One Headlight (1997)10°  Gustavo Cerati - Cosas Imposibles (2003)9°  Coldplay - Yellow (2001)8°  Hoobastank - The Reason (2004)7°  The Verve - Bitter Sweet Symphony (1997)6°  Audioslave - Like a Stone (2003)5°  Coldplay - Clocks (2003)4°  Red Hot Chili Peppers - Californication (2000)3°  Coldplay - The Scientist (2003)2°  Keane - Everybody's Changing (2005)Hot Z:  Keane - Somewhere Only We Know (2004)

(*) Ranking broadcast on 7 December.

(**) Ranking based on the 18th anniversary of the radiostation.

See also
 
 Media of Peru

References

External links
Z Rock & Pop

Radio stations in Peru